Françoise Dolto (November 6, 1908 – August 25, 1988) was a French pediatrician and psychoanalyst.

Biography
Born as Françoise Marette, she was the daughter of an affluent far-right royalist family of traditional Catholics in Paris. Her Alsatian mother, Suzanne Demmler, was the daughter of an engineer, and Henri Marette, her father, was also a Polytechnic engineer who became an industrialist. She was the fourth child of a family of seven. Her brother Jacques Marette (1922-1984), was French Postmaster (minister of Posts and Telecommunications) from 1962 to 1967.

An Irish nurse frequently took care of her when she was a baby; her parents then had to learn to speak English to get her to smile. Her parents fired the nurse when she was 8 months old. Dolto's very traditional upbringing, which Élisabeth Roudinesco described as "very Catholic, extreme right-wing", reflected the values of Charles Maurras.

Her personal tutor was trained in the methods of Friedrich Fröbel. When she was eight her uncle and godfather Pierre Demmler died in World War I. When she was twelve, she was very affected by the death of her older sister Jacqueline, her mother's favorite child. Her mother sank into a depression and accused her of not praying hard enough for her sister's life. Dolto's mother felt that a girl had no other prospects than marriage and therefore forbade her to pursue her studies. At sixteen she had to confront her mother, who did not want her to pass her baccalaureate because she would then not be able to get married. Nevertheless, Dolto attended the Lycée Molière in Paris where she graduated in philosophy in 1924–1925. In 1930 she obtained a nursing degree. A year later, she began her medical studies with her brother Philip, "paying for her studies with the money she earns".

Dolto was named by Michel Foucault as one of the prominent signatories of the 1977 French petition against age of consent laws.

Françoise Dolto was the mother of Carlos (1943–2008), a singer, Grégoire (1944-), an engineer, and Catherine (1946-).

Psychoanalysis
In 1932,  introduced Dolto to psychoanalyst René Laforgue, who had already begun to treat her brother Philip a year earlier. She participated thereby in the beginnings of French Freudianism. At the end of February 1934, she began a three-year analysis with Laforgue, which had a major impact on her life, helping to free her of her neurosis - of her education, her origin, and her depressive mother. Laforgue found that Dolto had an aptitude for analysis, and advised her to become a psychoanalyst, something which she at first rejected in favor of devoting herself to medicine.

During her medical training, working under Dr. Georges Heuyer, she met Sophie Morgenstern, who was the first to practice psychoanalysis with children in France, and who would subsequently be a mentor for her. She listened to the sick children who came to her for treatment, Dolto began (with the encouragement of Edouard Pichon) to specialise in child psychology, as a psychoanalytic pediatrician.  Her patients were mostly children with psychoses, with whom she began to develop her own idiosyncratic kind of treatment.

Her speciality was learning about the early mental stages of babies and children, notably their first experiences and methods of communication through their body. She emphasized the physical aspects of the mother-baby dyad, and stressed the importance of observation and understanding of the means of communication used by children with psychological problems, or learning and social disabilities. Her work on the unconscious body image – on the way children have a body-language before actual language – has been especially influential, being developed by, among others, Maud Mannoni. In 2013 her work was translated into English by Francoise Hivernel.

Dolto was a close friend and ally of Jacques Lacan, who she accompanied into the "École Freudienne de Paris".  She considered that "it was among those analysed by Lacan that I found those best able to understand children and...ready to understand the needs of a child, even a very young one, as a subject with a desire to express".

Death

Dolto contracted pulmonary fibrosis in 1984. She died on 25 August 1988 and was buried in the cemetery at Bourg-la-Reine alongside her husband Boris Dolto. This is also the burial place of their son, the singer Carlos, who died in 2008. On her tomb stone is inscribed: "Have no fear! I am the Path, the Truth and the Life"

Bibliography
 Psychanalyse et pédiatrie, medical thesis, 1971
 Le Cas Dominique, Éditions du Seuil (éd. du Seuil), Paris, 1971; engl. Dominique: Analysis of an Adolescent, Souvenir Press, 1974
 L'Évangile au risque de la psychanalyse (interviewed by Gérard Sévérin, philosopher, theologian, psychoanalyst), éd. , 1977
 Au jeu du désir, éd. du Seuil, Paris, 1981
 Séminaire de psychanalyse d’enfants (coop. Louis Caldaguès), éd. du Seuil, Paris, 1982, 
 Sexualité féminine, éd. Scarabée/A. M. Métailié, 1982
 L'image inconsciente du corps, éd. du Seuil, Paris, 1984. 
 Séminaire de psychanalyse d’enfants (coop. Jean-François de Sauverzac), éd. du Seuil, Paris, 1985, 
 Solitude, éd. Vertiges, Paris, 1985, 
 La Cause des enfants, éd. Robert Laffont, Paris, 1985, 
 Enfances, Paris, 1986
 Libido féminine, éd. Carrère, Paris, 1987
 L'Enfant du miroir (with Juan David Nasio), éd. Rivages, Paris, 1987, 
 La Cause des adolescents, éd. Robert Laffont, Paris, 1988
 Quand les parents se séparent (coop. Inès de Angelino), éd. du Seuil, Paris, 1988, ; engl. When Parents Separate, David R Godine Pub, 1997
 L'Échec scolaire, éd. Vertiges du Nord, 1989
 Autoportrait d'une psychanalyste, éd. du Seuil, Paris, 1989
 Paroles pour adolescents ou le complexe du homard, éd. Hattier, 1989
 Lorsque l'enfant paraît, éd. du Seuil, Paris, 1990
 Les Étapes majeures de l'enfance, éd. Gallimard, Paris, 1994
 Les Chemins de l'éducation, éd. Gallimard, Paris, 1994
 La Difficulté de vivre, éd. Gallimard, Paris, 1995
 Tout est langage, éd. Gallimard, Paris, 1995
 Le sentiment de soi : aux sources de l'image et du corps, éd. Gallimard, Paris, 1997
 Le Féminin, éd. Gallimard, Paris, 1998
 La vague et l'océan : séminaire sur les pulsions de mort (1970-1971), éd. Gallimard, Paris, 2003
 Lettres de jeunesse : correspondance, 1913-1938, éd. Gallimard, Paris; revized and augmented in 2003, 
 Une vie de correspondances : 1938-1988, éd. Gallimard, Paris, 2005, 
 Une psychanalyste dans la cité. L'aventure de la Maison verte, éd. Gallimard, Paris, 2009,

Secondary literature
 Jean-François de Sauverzac, Françoise Dolto itinéraire d'une psychanalyste, éd. Aubier, 1993, pocket edition: Flammarion 2008, 
 Jean-Claude Liaudet, Dolto expliquée aux parents, éd. L’Archipel, Paris, 1998. Traductions : A criança explicada aos pais [Segundo Dolto], éd. Pergaminho, Cascais (Portugal), 2000 ; Dolto para padres, Plaza & Janès editores, Barcelona (Espagne), 2000
 Bernard Martino, Le bébé est une personne, éd. Balland, Paris, 1985
 Françoise Dolto, aujourd’hui présente, in Actes du colloque de l’Unesco, pp. 14–17 janvier 1999, éd. Gallimard, Paris, 2000
 Catherine Dolto, Il y a 10 ans la psychanalyste des enfants disparaissait Catherine Dolto-Tolitch parle de l’après Dolto, Ed. Lien social, Numéro 467, 17 décembre 1998.
  Theory and Practise in Child Psychoanalysis: An Introduction to Francoise Dolto's Work, ed. by Guy Hall, Francoise Hivernel, Sian Morgan, Karnac Books, 2009, 
 René-Jean Bouyer: Les Mémoires d'un bébé : Un siècle d'éducation de l'enfant de Pasteur à Dolto, Jean-Claude Gawsewitch, 2010,

Critical literature
Guy Baret, Comment rater l’éducation de son enfant avec Françoise Dolto. Éd. Ramsay, 2003
Le livre noir de la psychanalyse. Vivre, penser et aller mieux sans Freud. direction by Catherine Meyer, édition Les Arènes, Paris, 2005
 Daniela Lumbroso, Françoise Dolto, la vie d'une femme libre, édition Plon, Paris, 2007
 Didier Pleux : 
Génération Dolto, éditions Odile Jacob, Paris, 2008
Françoise Dolto, la déraison pure., Preface by Michel Onfray. Éditions Autrement, Collection « Universités populaires et Cie », 2013
La Révolution du divan: Pour une psychologie existentielle. Éditions Odile Jacob, 2015
Sabine Gritt Un foetus mal léché.Trois ans avec Dolto., éditions sciences humaines, 2015

See also
 Juliette Favez-Boutonnier

References

 

1908 births
1988 deaths
French psychoanalysts
French medical writers
Writers from Paris
Analysands of René Laforgue
Women medical writers
French pediatricians
Women pediatricians
20th-century French physicians
20th-century French non-fiction writers
20th-century French women writers
20th-century women physicians